Ust-Barguzin (Bargajanai Adag) is an urban locality (an urban-type settlement) in Barguzinsky District of the Republic of Buryatia, Russia, located on the shore of Lake Baikal at the mouth of the Barguzin River and  northeast of Ulan-Ude, the capital of the republic. As of the 2010 Census, its population was 7,173.

History
It was founded in 1666 by a Cossack detachment under Gavril Lovzov.

Administrative and municipal status
Within the framework of administrative divisions, the urban-type settlement (inhabited locality) of Ust-Barguzin, together with eight rural localities, is incorporated within Barguzinsky District as Ust-Barguzin Urban-Type Settlement (an administrative division of the district). As a municipal division, Ust-Barguzin Urban-Type Settlement is incorporated within Barguzinsky Municipal District as Ust-Barguzin Urban Settlement.

Climate
Ust-Barguzin has a subarctic climate (Köppen climate classification Dwc) with severely cold winters and mild summers. Precipitation is quite low and is significantly higher in summer than at other times of the year.

References

Notes

Sources

Urban-type settlements in Buryatia
Populated places in Barguzinsky District
Populated places on Lake Baikal